The men's triple jump event at the 2011 All-Africa Games was held on 12 September.

Results

References
Results
Results

Triple
2011